The Kyzyloi Field (Qyzyloı gaz ken orny) is a dry natural gas field in southern Kazakhstan about  to the north of the border with the Karalkalpak region of Uzbekistan and  to the north-west of the Aral Sea. It is a first gas field in Kazakhstan, which is operated by independent operator.

Field specification
The net proved and probable economically recoverable reserves are approximately 1.42 billion cubic meter.

Production
A commercial gas production commenced on 19 December 2007. All produced gas is sold to the gas trading company GazImpex and assigned to Kazakhstan's Petrochemical Company Kemikal LLP.

Gas is exported from the Kyzyloi field along a  pipeline to Tethys' compressor station adjacent to the tie-in point to the major Bukhara-Urals export trunkline system where three gas fired compressors compress the gas into the trunkline.

Operator
The field is developed and operated by BN Munai LLP, a subsidiary of Tethys Petroleum Investments Limited.

References

External links

 The Kyzyloi Field - Dry Gas Development (Tethys Petroleum website)

Natural gas fields in Kazakhstan